This is a list of Brazilian television related events from 1976.

Events

Debuts
24 December - Turma da Mônica (1976–present)

Television shows

1970s
Vila Sésamo (1972-1977, 2007–present)

Births
21 July - Emanuelle Araújo, singer & actress
10 August - Mariana Santos, actress & comedian
29 August - Luana Piovani, actress & model
8 October - Karina Bacchi, actress & model
25 October - Rafael Cortez, actor, journalist, comedian & TV host

Deaths

See also
1976 in Brazil